Kirsten Kjelsberg Osen (born 20 July 1928) is a Norwegian anatomist and otologist.

Personal life
Osen was born in Alta, the daughter of a teacher and school principal. Osen graduated as Candidate of Medicine in 1954 and as Doctor Medicinae in 1970.

Career 
She was appointed professor of morphology at the University of Tromsø in 1971, and was the first female professor of medicine in Norway. Her principal field of research has been studies of the cochlear nuclei. She has been active in the Norwegian chapter of the International Physicians for the Prevention of Nuclear War, and the Norwegian Pugwash committee. She is a member of the Norwegian Academy of Science and Letters since 1995.

Personal life 
Osen married flight inspector Knut Osen in 1955.

References

1928 births
Living people
People from Alta, Norway
Norwegian anatomists
Norwegian medical researchers
Norwegian surgeons
Otolaryngologists
Norwegian women scientists
Academic staff of the University of Oslo
Academic staff of the University of Tromsø
Members of the Norwegian Academy of Science and Letters
Women anatomists